Estonia competed as a nation for the first time at the Summer Olympic Games at the 1920 Summer Olympics in Antwerp, Belgium. Estonia sent 14 athletes and 4 representatives to those games. Representatives were Ado Anderkopp, Leopold Tõnson, William Fiskar and Karl Metti.

Medalists

Athletics 

Men
Track & road events

Field events

Combined events – Men's Pentathlon

Combined events – Men's decathlon

Weightlifting

Wrestling

Greco-Roman
 Men's

References
Official Olympic Reports
International Olympic Committee results database

External links

 EOK – Antverpen 1920 

Nations at the 1920 Summer Olympics
1920
Olympics